Li Yong may refer to:

 Li Yong (poet) (678–747), Tang dynasty poet and calligrapher
 Li Yong (chancellor) (died 820), Tang Dynasty chancellor
 Li Yong (prince) (died 838), Tang Dynasty prince
 Li Yong (politician) (born 1951), Chinese politician
 Li Yong (television host) (1968–2018), Chinese television host